Shemonaikha is a district of East Kazakhstan Region in eastern Kazakhstan. The administrative center of the district is the town of Shemonaikha. Population:

Geography 
Located in the north of East Kazakhstan Region. It borders in the east with Glubokovsky, in the west - with Borodulikha, in the south - with Ulansky districts of East Kazakhstan region, in the north - with Altai Territory Russian Federation.

History 
Shemonaikha district was formed on January 17, 1928 from Shemonaevskaya, parts of Kalininskaya, Ubinskaya volosts Semipalatinsk district and part of Krasnooktyabrskaya volost Ust-Kamenogorsk district with the center in the village of Shemonaikha. On June 11, 1959, the Arable Council, Verkhubinsky, Vydrikinsky and Bolsherechensky village councils of the abolished Verkh-Ubinsky district were attached to the Shemonaikha district.

References

Districts of Kazakhstan
East Kazakhstan Region